Mirchi Music Awards are presented annually by Radio Mirchi to honour both artistic and technical excellence of professionals in the Hindi language film music industry of India. The awards, given in seventeen different categories, were instituted to award the best of 2008. In 2010, the Southern edition of the awards – Mirchi Music Awards South was launched, to award the best of 2009. through which artists from the four South Indian film industries—Tamil, Telugu, Kannada and Malayalam—are being honoured. In 2012, the Bengali edition of the awards – Mirchi Music Awards Bangla was launched, to award the best of 2011. The 2019 Mirchi Music Awards is co-powered by Smule, the world's largest music social network, and will have the winner of the Smule Mirchi Cover Star perform on stage at the event.

Ceremonies

Jury
The jury for both editions of the awards consists of several experts from the Bollywood music industry. Javed Akhtar, poet and lyricist, is the chairman of the jury. The other members are (listed alphabetically) music composers Aadesh Shrivastava, Pandit Sujit Ojha , Anu Malik, Lalit Pandit and Louis Banks, playback singers Alka Yagnik, Kailash Kher, Kavita Krishnamurthy, Sadhana Sargam, Shankar Mahadevan, Sukhwinder Singh, Suresh Wadkar & Udit Narayan lyricist Prasoon Joshi, and directors Rakeysh Omprakash Mehra and Ramesh Sippy.

Critics' Choice Awards
 Song of The Year
 Album of The Year
 Male Vocalist of The Year
 Female Vocalist of The Year
 Music Composer of The Year
 Lyricist of The Year
 Upcoming Male Vocalist of The Year
 Upcoming Female Vocalist of The Year
 Upcoming Music Composer of The Year
 Upcoming Lyricist of The Year

Technical Awards

Sound Engineer of the Year

Song Mixing

Programming and Arranging

Film Background Score

Listeners' Choice Awards

Song of The Year

Album of The Year

Special awards

Jury Award for Outstanding Contribution to Hindi Film Music

Best item number song

Lifetime Achievement Award / K. L. Saigal Sangeet Shehenshah Award 
The award was given to Indian playback singer Lata Mangeshkar in 2008. The award was renamed in 2009 as K. L. Saigal Sangeet Shehenshah Award, in honour of singer Kundan Lal Saigal. The award was given to Indian Playback singer K. J. Yesudas in 2010.

References

External links
 1st Mirchi Music Awards
 2nd Mirchi Music Awards
 3rd Mirchi Music Awards
 4th Mirchi Music Awards
5th Mirchi Music Awards
 9th Mirchi Music Awards
 10th Mirchi Music Awards

 
Hindi cinema
Awards established in 2009
Indian music awards
2009 establishments in Maharashtra